Shaduppum (modern Tell Harmal) is an archaeological site in Baghdad Governorate (Iraq). Nowadays, it lies within the borders of modern Baghdad.

History of archaeological research

The site, 150 meters in diameter and 5 meters high, was excavated by Iraqi archaeologist Taha Baqir of the Department of Antiquities and Heritage from 1945 to 1963, discovering about 2000 tablets. Stories about Creation, the flood, The epic of Gilgamesh, and other  were inscribed on some of the tablets  In 1997 and 1998, the site was worked by a team from Baghdad University and the German Archaeological Institute led by Peter Miglus and Laith Hussein. Many other illegally excavated tablets have found their way into various institutions.

Occupation history 
Not much is known outside the Old Babylonian times, though clearly the location was occupied from at least the Akkadian period through the Old Babylonian period, when it was part of the kingdom of Eshnunna in the Diyala River area. It was an administrative center for the kingdom and its name means "the treasury."

The site featured a large trapezoidal wall and a temple to the goddess Nisaba and the god Khani. Among the tablets from Tell Harmal are two of the epic of Gilgamesh and two with parts of the Laws of Eshnunna as well as some important mathematical tablets.

See also

Cities of the ancient Near East

References

Further reading
Maria de J. Ellis, Old Babylonian Economic Texts and Letters from Tell Harmal, Journal of Cuneiform Studies, Vol. 24, No. 3, pp. 43–69, 1972
Gwendolyn Leick, Francis J. Kirk, A Dictionary of Ancient Near Eastern Architecture, Routledge, 1988, 
Maria deJ. Ellis, The Division of Property at Tell Harmal, Journal of Cuneiform Studies, vol. 26, no. 3, pp. 133–153, 1974 
Lamia al-Gailani Werr, A Note on the Seal Impression IM 52599 from Tell Harmal, Journal of Cuneiform Studies, vol. 30, no. 1, pp. 62–64, 1978 
Maria deJ. Ellis, An Old Babylonian Adoption Contract from Tell Harmal, Journal of Cuneiform Studies, vol. 27, no. 3, pp. 130–151, 1975 
T. Baqir, An important mathematical problem text from Tell Harmal, Sumer, vol. 6, pp. 39–54, 1950
T. Baqir, Another important mathematical text from Tell Harmal, Sumer, vol. 6, pp. 130–148, 1950 
A. Goetze, A mathematical compendium from Tell Harmal, Sumer, vol. 7, pp. 126–155, 1951
T Baqir  Some more mathematical texts from Tell Harmal, Sumer, vol. 7, pp. 28–45, 1951

External links
Archaeological Site Photographs: Tell Harmal - Oriental Institute of Chicago
1997/98 excavation report of the joint German/Iraqi team
Baked Clay Lion from Tell Harmal
Old Babylonian Cuneiform Prism from Tell Harmal
Tell Harmal Lions at Baghdad Museum

Baghdad Governorate
Archaeological sites in Iraq
Former populated places in Iraq